John Edward Collins is a member of The New Pornographers, Destroyer, and The Evaporators. He plays the bass, guitar, synthesizer, ebow and sings.

He also acted as a producer, mixer, engineer, and multi-instrumentalist on Tegan and Sara's 2002 release, If It Was You and 2004 release So Jealous.  Collins produced Theresa Sokyrka's 2006 release Something Is Expected, and Eamon McGrath's Peace Maker (2010).

References 

Year of birth missing (living people)
Living people
The New Pornographers members
Canadian indie rock musicians
Canadian record producers
Canadian rock bass guitarists